Kerri Kasem (born Carrie H. Kasem, July 12, 1972) is an American radio host. She hosted the nationally syndicated Sixx Sense and The Side Show Countdown With Nikki Sixx from February 2010 to April 2014. Kasem later became a judge on Who Will Rock You, alongside Dee Snider.

Early life
Kasem was born in Los Angeles, California. She and her siblings Mike and Julie are the three children of radio personality Casey Kasem and his first wife, Linda Myers, to whom he was married from 1972 to 1979.

Career
Kasem was co-host with Alan Stock on KXNT 840 AM in Las Vegas for a morning radio talk show. She left KXNT in August 2007. She hosted the nationally syndicated Sixx Sense and The Side Show Countdown With Nikki Sixx from February 2010 to April 2014. Other radio shows on which she worked include Racing Rocks the National Lampoon Comedy Countdown, The Solomon Free Money Hour, and Pet Talk. In 2003, she was a reality television show contestant on ESPN's Beg, Borrow & Deal. She has appeared on the E! channel, and is a host on UFC and on Sí TV's The Rub. She later became a co-host, with Alan Gurvey, on Gurvey's Law on KABC.

Kasem appeared on The Dr. Oz Show on October 12, 2021, to talk about the death of her father Casey Kasem.

Personal life
Kasem is founder of Kasem Cares and the Kasem Coalition, both created to raise awareness of elder abuse. In 2014, Kasem won conservatorship over her father when the court found his second wife, Jean Kasem, put his life in danger.

Kerri Kasem has worked as a volunteer for the Church of Scientology as part of its Volunteer Ministers program in Haiti during the 2010 Haiti earthquake crisis and in Texas when Hurricane Harvey hit.

References

External links

Living people
People from Los Angeles County, California
American people of Lebanese descent
American radio DJs
American radio personalities
Television personalities from California
American women television personalities
1972 births